Coulman may refer to:

Coulman Island, an island of Victoria Land, Antarctica
Mike Coulman (born 1944), English rugby league and rugby union player